The 2012–13 Vancouver Canucks season was the team's 43rd season in the National Hockey League (NHL). The Canucks won their fifth-straight Northwest Division title and finished third in the Western Conference. In the 2013 Stanley Cup playoffs, Vancouver was swept by the San Jose Sharks in the first round. Shortly after the Canucks' playoff elimination, head coach Alain Vigneault was fired.

Prior to the beginning of the season the NHL Collective Bargaining Agreement (CBA) expired, resulting in a lockout. The season was threatened with cancellation before the lockout ended, ultimately the length of the labor dispute resulted in the reduction of games from the standard 82 to a shortened 48. Cory Schneider entered the season as the team's new starting goaltender, while the Canucks attempted to trade incumbent Roberto Luongo. The two goaltenders battled for playing time early in the season resulting in a goaltender controversy. After a six-game winning streak to start February, the Canucks dealt with multiple injuries and suspensions resulting in the team slumping. In late March Schneider captured the starters job starting seven consecutive games helping the team to a second six-game winning streak. Vancouver dueled the Minnesota Wild in the standings before pulling away in April and winning the division. Led by Henrik and Daniel Sedin, the Canucks' power play struggled dropping from 4th the previous season to 23rd, with the Sedin twins' point production declining. Derek Roy was brought in through a trade to help deal with injuries at centre in the team's only trade of the year. Schneider was injured late in the season and missed the first two games of the playoffs. Vancouver lost the fourth game of their playoff series on a controversial call on Daniel Sedin.

Three franchise records were set during the season. Henrik Sedin became the Canucks all-time leading scorer, surpassing Markus Naslund. Alex Burrows scored six seconds into a game making it the fastest goal to start a game for Vancouver. Alain Vigneault became the all-time leader in games coached. As a way of celebrating 100 years of hockey in British Columbia, the Canucks wore a special patch on their jerseys with the logo of the Vancouver Millionaires, the first professional team in the city. They also wore replica jerseys of the Millionaires for one game.

Off-season

Following an early exit from the 2012 Stanley Cup playoffs, the off-season began with speculation that head coach Alain Vigneault might be fired. There were also rumors that general manager (GM) Mike Gillis could be removed from his position. After an end of the year meeting with team owner Francesco Aquilini, Gillis signed a new five-year contract. Fifteen days after his new contract, Gillis signed Vigneault to a new two-year contract.

The Canucks announced that they would be celebrating 100 years of hockey in British Columbia during the season. To that end, they would wear a special patch on their jerseys with the logo of the Vancouver Millionaires, the first professional team in the city. They also would wear replica jerseys of the Millionaires for their March 16 game against the Detroit Red Wings.

After being replaced as starter for the final three playoff games, Roberto Luongo said that he would be willing to waive his no-trade clause if asked. Following the re-signing of Cory Schneider to a three-year $12 million extension, trade rumors increased. It was later reported that Luongo wanted to be traded and that "it was time to move on". Though as training camp approached, Luongo had not been traded. He indicated that he would have no issues returning to the Canucks. Gillis further stated that although he had received several "strong" offers, the Canucks were not having a "fire sale" for Luongo. Doug MacLean on Sportsnet's Hockey Central reported that a trade was in place to send Luongo to the Toronto Maple Leafs. However, Luongo, believing the Florida Panthers, his preferred destination, were going to make a deal for him, refused to waive his no-trade clause. Luongo later said that he never turned down a trade.

2012–13 lockout 

Prior to the NHL Collective Bargaining Agreement (CBA) expiring in September, teams reassigned players on two-way or entry-level contracts to minor league affiliates. The Canucks assigned 27 players, including Christopher Tanev, Eddie Lack, Zack Kassian and 2012 second-round draft pick Alexandre Mallet to the Chicago Wolves, while first-round pick Brendan Gaunce was sent to his junior team, the Belleville Bulls. When the CBA expired on September 15, the NHL enforced a lockout until a new agreement could be reached. Canucks management posted a message from the team to the fans stating that they would continue with community initiatives throughout the lockout, which they hoped would be resolved as soon as possible, and thanked fans for their loyalty and patience. They also reduced their employees work week to four days and instituted a 20% pay reduction.

Four days into the lockout, the NHL cancelled all pre-season games before September 30, cutting the first four games from Vancouver's schedule. A week later, with no further talks between the two sides, the remainder of the preseason was canceled. With no movement on a new deal, the NHL cancelled its first set of regular season games on October 4. Games continued to be cancelled in blocks culminating in their cancellation through January 14. As the lockout dragged on, NHL Commissioner Gary Bettman gave a self-imposed a deadline of January 11 to agree to terms on a new CBA or the entire season would be cancelled. As the deadline approached, Bettman and the head of the National Hockey League Players' Association (NHLPA), Donald Fehr, engaged in a 16-hour negotiation session that produced a tentative agreement to end the lockout. Both sides ratified the deal and a memorandum of understanding was signed on January 12. This  officially ended the lockout and allowed training camps to open the following day. Due to the length of the lockout, the NHL announced a new scheduled for a shortened 48-game season after it ended.

Training camp 

Under the prior CBA, players could not be traded until after the lockout was resolved, meaning Roberto Luongo could not be moved. Once a new CBA was reached, the trade rumors returned, including one that alleged Maple Leafs GM Brian Burke was fired in order to help facilitate a trade. For his part, Luongo reiterated that he was willing to remain with the Canucks for the shortened season, but did not want to remain long-term.

With training camp starting on January 13, 2013, Vancouver recalled 12 players from the Wolves. They also bolstered their defence corp by signing NHL veterans Jim Vandermeer and Cam Barker to one-year contracts. At the forward position, the Canucks were dealing with injuries to their second line. Centre Ryan Kesler, who was recovering from off-season surgeries to his shoulder and wrist, would be unable to start the season; it was unknown how long he would be out rehabbing the injuries. Winger David Booth was injured during the team's physicals to start camp. After having an MRI done on his injury, it was announced that Booth would miss four to six weeks recovering. Alain Vigneault stated that he hoped to keep his third and fourth lines intact, leaving the possible replacements as, Andrew Ebbett, Jordan Schroeder and Zack Kassian. Schroeder was a first-round draft pick for Vancouver in 2009, but had never played in an NHL game. Ebbett a utility, journeyman forward played in 18 games for Vancouver in 2011–12. While the second-year Kassian produced only four goals in his rookie campaign. Vancouver elected to start the season with Ebbett and put Kassian on their second line. In order to keep defensive depth, the Canucks decided to keep nine defenceman. Schroeder was sent back to the minors in order to comply with the 23-man roster and because he would not need to clear waivers.

Regular season

January 

After winning back to back Presidents' Trophies in prior seasons the Canucks were projected as Stanley Cup contenders. The prediction was based on Vancouver's team depth, the offense provided by Daniel and Henrik Sedin, the two-way play of Kesler and Alexandre Burrows, plus the versatility of the Canuck's top four defenceman. The Hockey News predicted that the Canucks would win the Northwest Division and finish as the second place team in the Western Conference.

Schneider began the year as the team's starting goaltender. In his first game against the Anaheim Ducks, Schneider allowed five goals on 14 shots and was pulled midway through the second period. When Luongo entered the game he was given a standing ovation from the crowd. Luongo gave up another two goals as the Canucks lost 7–3. In the post-game interview, Schneider took the blame for the loss, saying, "It was unacceptable to play that way and to put my team in that situation and not even give them a chance to win." He also stated he would work hard to fix the mistakes, while Luongo said of his ovation that it was "a fun moment." The situation quickly led to a goalie controversy. Luongo made the start the following night against the Edmonton Oilers. According to Vigneault, he had already determined the starting assignments for the opening two games, and Schneider did not factor into Luongo's start. In the game, Luongo allowed two goals after Vancouver had taken a 2–0 lead. The Canucks lost the game 3–2 in a shootout. Luongo failed to stop either of the two shooters he faced, while Vancouver did not score. After losing their first two games, Vancouver added to their forward depth recalling Jordan Schroeder from the AHL and assigning Jim Vandermeer to the Wolves. Schroeder took over the second line duties after Andrew Ebbett went pointless in the first two contests.

Schneider started Vancouver's next game against the Calgary Flames. For the second-straight game, Vancouver lost a two-goal lead in a game which eventually went to a shootout. In contrast to his first start, Schneider had a strong game, making 34 saves by the end of overtime. In the shootout, he stopped four of the five shooters he faced, earning the Canucks their first win of the season. Two nights later, as they began their first road trip, the Canucks played a rematch with the Ducks in Anaheim. Schneider made the start and earned some redemption, stopping all 30 Anaheim shots, helping the Canucks to the 5–0 win and earning his fifth career shutout. Following the win, Schneider started the next game, a 4–1 loss to the San Jose Sharks. Luongo started the next four games, finishing off the month of January and beginning February. Vigneault joked that he was making his starting goaltender decisions based on coin tosses. He further noted that the two goaltenders were team guys and they would do what was asked of them and never complain. The coin became a running joke for Vigneault and the Canucks in general, as Ryan Kesler stated he flipped it before announcing his return from injury.

February 

At forward, Kassian began the year on the top line with the Sedin twins. Kassian scored five goals in the first seven games of the season. Partway through the Canucks' second game of February, Kassian was replaced on the top line by Alexandre Burrows. Kassian was dropped to the third line. Despite Kassian surpassing his goal total from his rookie season, the Sedins started the year with their lowest output in nearly ten years, combining for 14 points in the first 10 games. Coinciding with the line changes, Vancouver went on a six-game winning streak between the end of January and their February 12 game. After the last game of their winning streak, the Canucks were expecting Kesler to return to the line-up.

As Kesler was returning from injury, Vancouver placed centre Manny Malhotra on injured reserve (IR) for the remainder of the season. In regards to the move, Gillis stated he felt Malhotra was vulnerable to serious injury because of an eye injury he suffered in 2011. The decision was made despite Malhotra playing in 78 games in the 2011–12 season and nine games in 2013. Gillis further noted that he had reservation about him playing in the previous season, but wanted to give Malhotra a chance to adapt. After watching him play, Gillis did not see the types of changes that would not put him at a higher risk of injury. Upon placing Malhotra on IR, Gillis called it the hardest thing he had done as a GM. NHL Deputy Commissioner Bill Daly released a statement on the situation, saying "the League is satisfied and has approved the team's and player's joint decision to discontinue the player's participation in NHL games at this time on the basis of the player's current medical condition and the risk of injury that such condition poses." The Canucks also announced that Malhotra would remain with the team in some capacity, but would not return to the ice including in the playoffs.

Kesler played his first game of the season on February 15 against the Dallas Stars. The game was also witness to a piece of Canucks history as Henrik Sedin recorded two assists to pass Markus Naslund as the franchise's all-time leading scorer, with 757 points. After recording the record setting point, Sedin was given a standing ovation that carried on as play continued. After three minutes the play stopped, and Sedin saluted the crowd. During a commercial break, the Canucks ran a tribute video for the accomplishment, featuring congratulations from Naslund and Trevor Linden, the third-leading scorer in team history. As for Kesler, he registered an assist and blocked three shots in over 17 minutes of ice time of the 4–3 loss. After experiencing some discomfort in his right foot, Kesler had X-rays taken. The X-rays were negative and he continued to play.

Four days after Kesler's return, Jannik Hansen was involved in a controversial hit on the Chicago Blackhawks' Marian Hossa. As both players went up for an airborne puck, Hansen struck Hossa in the back of the head with his forearm and elbow. Hossa then laid on the ice for a few minutes, during which time the training staff examined him before he was able to leave under his own power. Hansen was given a two-minute minor for roughing and Hossa did not return to the game. Opinions of the hit varied with former NHL referee Kerry Fraser, stating that he did not believe that there was any deliberate or malicious intent, and that he would be surprised if Hansen received a suspension for the play. Meanwhile, former Blackhawks analyst Ed Olczyk stated, "there's no doubt in my mind, once he didn't play the puck, he had one thing in his mind, and that was to put his forearm or elbow in the back of the head of Marian Hossa," and he would be surprised if Hansen was not suspended. Hossa returned to practice the following day. Hansen was suspended for one game due to what Brendan Shanahan called "the carelessness and force of which the blow was delivered."

With Kesler back in the lineup, the Canucks were inconstant posting a 2–3–2 record. Kesler registered five points in the seven games, but was playing with the discomfort steaming from a blocked shot in his first game back against Dallas. He was given a CT scan for his peace of mind. The results of the scan revealed a fracture in his foot. Though no time table for his return was given, the expectation was that he would be out of the line-up for four-to-six weeks. Late in the month, Kevin Bieksa suffered a groin injury in a game versus the Nashville Predators. He missed the next two games as Vancouver finished the month with back-to-back losses. After being reunited with Burrows, the Sedin twins registered a combined 18 points in the final six games of February, while Kassian tallied only three assists in the 11 games after his demotion.

March 

Bieksa returned for the first game in the month of March, a 5–2 win over the Los Angeles Kings. During the game, he re-aggravated the injury and was listed as day-to-day. With Bieksa and Kesler out, Vancouver slumped dropping three straight games going 0–1–2. Entering their March 10 game against the Minnesota Wild, the lead for the Northwest Division was at stake. A regulation win for the Wild would give them the lead based on tie breakers. Vancouver lost the game 4–2 and dropped to sixth place in the Western Conference. The Canucks reclaimed the division lead two days later with a win over the Columbus Blue Jackets. In the March 16 game against Detroit, Alexandre Burrows set a franchise record when he scored six seconds into the game, making it the fastest goal to start a game in team history. Vancouver failed to capitalize on the early lead, losing the game 5–2 and falling back into a tie with the Wild.  The Canucks re-matched the Wild two days later with a chance to take sole possession of the division lead. Vancouver took the lead in the second scoring on the power play. The goal marked the first power play tally in 11 games, ending a 0–36 slump, the worst in franchise history. Much like the Detroit game, the Canucks failed to take advantage of the early lead and lost the game 3–1 and fell to seventh in the Conference.

Schneider started Vancouver's next game and earned the win against the St. Louis Blues. The win marked the beginning of a six-game winning streak with Schneider as the starting goaltender each game. He allowed a total of six goals during the steak and posted two shutouts. The wins put the Canucks back into first in the Northwest. In the second game of their winning streak, defenceman Alexander Edler collided with Phoenix Coyotes' goaltender Mike Smith and was given a five-minute major for charging. The following day, Edler was given a two-game suspension for his actions. Also during the Canucks' winning streak, they began to have injury problems. Booth suffered a leg injury that required surgery which ended his season. In 12 games played, Booth scored only a single goal into an empty net. Winger Dale Weise injured a shoulder. Kassian suffered a back injury, and Steve Pinizzotto missed games due to an illness. With the forward corps depleted, defenceman Keith Ballard was moved to forward. He continued to play upfront until he suffered a broken foot.

In his seventh consecutive start, Schneider gave up two early goals to the Edmonton Oilers and was pulled in favor of Luongo. The goals were scored on Edmonton's first two shots. Goals continued to come in quick succession as Taylor Hall scored his second goal, Edmonton's third, 2:34 into the game, setting an Oilers franchise record for the fastest three goals to start a game. Hall set another Edmonton record minutes later when he completed the hat-trick at 7:58 in the first. It marked the fastest hat-trick to start a game, surpassing Wayne Gretzky's previous record. Vancouver did not allow another goal, but failed to score, losing 4–0.  They were again passed by Minnesota for the division lead and finished March as the fourth-placed team in the Western Conference.

April 

In their first game of April, Vancouver attempted to improve its offensive production by re-calling their 2011 first round draft choice, Nicklas Jensen, and forward Bill Sweatt. The recalls failed to produce, however, as the Canucks lost to the San Jose Sharks 3–2. The following day, the Canucks acquired centre Derek Roy from the Dallas Stars for Kevin Connauton and a second-round draft pick. The trade was believed to be an attempt to fill a hole at centre while Kesler was out with an injury. The expectation was that Roy would become the team's third line center once Kesler returned to the line-up, though the possibility of the two playing together was proposed.  At the NHL trade deadline, Vancouver failed to trade Luongo. They were reportedly close to a deal with the Toronto Maple Leafs, which eventually fell through. In response to finding out that he would not be traded, Luongo stated, "My contract sucks – that's what's the problem," and would "scrap it if I could now." The Canucks felt they needed more size and grit in their line-up and attempted to add some though trades. However, they missed out on acquiring Ryane Clowe and Raffi Torres. Clowe chose to waive his no-trade clause to go to the New York Rangers so he could play in the Eastern Conference. The Coyotes traded Torres to the Sharks, as they considered San Jose's third-round pick more attractive than the Canucks' third-rounder.

In his first game as a Canuck, Roy tallied an assist helping Vancouver to a 4–0 win. The win moved the Canucks passed Minnesota for the division lead. The shutout marked Schneider's fourth of the season, which doubled his career total. Two games later, Schneider registered his fifth shutout of the season in a 2–0 over the Coyotes, tying him for the League lead. The game also marked the return of Kesler, who scored the game-winning goal. Minnesota slumped towards the end of the season and the Canucks won their fifth-straight Northwest Division title with a 2–1 victory over the Blackhawks. In the game, Schneider suffered a groin injury and was unable to play the last two games of the season; he was listed by the Canucks as day-to-day with a "body" injury. With Schneider out, the Canucks lost their final two regular season games. In their final loss, Vigneault rested many of his regulars, though he received criticism for playing Henrik Sedin for only 22 seconds. Furthermore, Sedin left the bench after his one shift. The Los Angeles Times''' Helene Elliott called it a cheap way of keeping Sedin's ironman streak intact. For his part, Henrik Sedin told Vigneault that "he would be okay with sitting out the game" and to him the streak is just "a number in the paper." Vigneault responded by telling Sedin that "he's not going to be the one that breaks the streak," and he gave him the choice to remain on the bench or return to the locker room. Sedin felt remaining on the bench would have been a further distraction and chose to leave. By season's end, the Sedin twins' point production dropped from the previous years. Henrik's point points-per-game average was the lowest it had been since 2007–08, while Daniel's was his worst since 2003–04. The Cauncks' power play also struggled throughout the year dropping from fourth in 2011–12 to 23rd in the League.

Playoffs

Vancouver entered the playoffs as the Western Conference's third seed by virtue of winning the Northwest Division. As a result, they faced the sixth-seeded San Jose Sharks. The series was a rematch of the 2011 Western Conference Finals, in which Vancouver defeated the Sharks in five games to advance to the 2011 Stanley Cup Finals. However, the Sharks had won all three of the regular season games during the season.

With Schneider still injured, Luongo started the first game of the series. There was concern that Kesler would also be unable to play in Game 1. When asked about Kesler, Vigneault joked, "We've got him locked in a back room. We're feeding him raw meat. The beast will be ready tonight." Luongo started strong, holding the Sharks scoreless in the first period despite the Canucks being outshot 6–1 in the first 4:06 of the game. Vancouver took a 1–0 lead midway through the second, though San Jose tied the game shortly after and added two more goals in the third to win the game 3–1. Luongo finished with 25 saves, Kesler played over 21 minutes, registering only two shots and finishing as a –1. Leading up to Game 2, Kesler vowed to be better. It was also rumored he had the flu in Game 1. Schneider was still unable to play, and there were concerns he would not be traveling with the team to San Jose for Game 3. In Game 2, the Canucks trailed 1–0 after two periods of play. In the third period, Kesler scored a power play goal to tie the game and six minutes later, capitalized on a Sharks turnover to put Vancouver up 2–1. With Canucks leading late, San Jose pulled their goaltender for the extra attacker. With the net empty, Jannik Hansen had a chance to put the game away but missed the net. Shortly after with the play in Vancouver's end, Henrik Sedin attempted to make a pass to the middle of the ice which resulted in a turnover. On the ensuing play, a Dan Boyle shot deflected off Alexander Edler and through the pads of Luongo. The puck stopped short of the goal line, but Patrick Marleau tapped the puck in to tie the game. In overtime, a blocked shot led to an odd man rush for the Sharks, resulting in Raffi Torres scoring the game-winning goal. The loss put the Canucks down 2–0 in the series. Vancouver had never won a series after losing the first two games.

Schneider returned from injury to play in Game 3 after missing two weeks. After the first two periods, the Canucks trailed 2–1. The Sharks scored quickly in the third period and by the 4:07 mark had scored three goals to make it a 5–1 game. After the fifth goal, Schneider was pulled and replaced by Luongo. Vancouver eventually lost the game 5–2, with Schneider making 23 saves on 28 shots. Luongo stopped all 10 shots he faced. In the post-game press conference, Schneider stated he felt good, but did not do enough to help out his teammates. Later, questions were raised about who would be the starter for Game 4. Luongo stated he would be ready if asked to play, but also stated he would be supportive of Schneider if he was the starter. Sharks' centre Joe Thornton stated that San Jose felt Luongo had played great in the first two games, and they were lucky not to have to face him in Game 3. In Game 4, Schneider made the start and after two periods, the Canucks trailed 2–1. Midway through the third period, Vancouver had taken the lead, but late in the period, San Jose tied the game with a power play goal to force overtime. In the extra period, Daniel Sedin checked Tommy Wingels, which sent the Sharks winger's head into the boards. Sedin was given a controversial boarding penalty on the play. On the ensuing power play, San Jose scored to win the game and complete the series sweep. After the goal was scored, Daniel voiced his opinion of the call to the referees and was given a game misconduct penalty for abusive language. When asked about the call after the game, he replied, "It's the playoffs. It's shoulder to shoulder," and it was a bad call, though he further noted that the Canucks did not lose the series on the call. Brother Henrik noted that it was "a bullshit call" also pointing out that it was shoulder to shoulder. Referee Kelly Sutherland explained the call by stating he deemed it a violent shove into the boards where the player could not defend himself. For his part, Schneider made 43 saves on 47 shots in Game 4, he stated that he was 100% healthy and his groin injury was not a factor in his play.

 Post-season 

At an end of the season press conference, GM Mike Gillis stated the Canucks would "hit the reset button on a number of different fronts." Days later Vigneault was fired, along with assistant coaches, Rick Bowness and Newell Brown. Vigneault left as the all-time winningest coach in Canucks history, while winning two Presidents' Trophies and six Northwest Division titles. A month later, John Tortorella was hired as the new head coach. Tortorella had been fired by the New York Rangers earlier in the off-season following a second round playoff loss to the Boston Bruins.

After the coaching situation had been settled, Gillis next turned his attention back to trading Luongo. The Canucks were hoping to make a deal at the 2013 NHL Entry Draft. As the draft approached, it was reported the Canucks were also shopping Schneider. Originally, it was believed the rumors were an attempt by Gillis to gain leverage for any potential Luongo deals. However, in a surprise move, Schneider was trade to the New Jersey Devils for the ninth overall pick in the draft, which Vancouver used to select Bo Horvat. Fans, as well as both Luongo and Schneider, were shocked by the news. Luongo stated, "I have to let this sink in and figure out what I'm going to do." While Schneider stated he was not sure what to say or think and he was speechless, adding, "it was nice to have resolution to the situation."

Standings

Divisional standings

Conference standings

Schedule and results

Regular season

Playoffs

Detailed records

Player statistics

Skaters

Goaltenders

†Traded to Canucks mid-season. Stats reflect time with Canucks only.
‡Traded to another team mid-season. Stats reflect time with Canucks only.
Bold/italics denotes franchise record

 Awards and honours 

 Awards 

Milestones

Records

Transactions
During the off-season, Vancouver signed defenceman Jason Garrison to a six-year contract worth $27.6 million. While the Canucks brought in Garrison, they lost longtime defenceman Sami Salo. The Canucks wanted to re-sign Salo, though they were unwilling to sign him to a two-year contract and offered only a one-year deal. Salo chose to leave and signed a two-year, $7.5 million contract with the Tampa Bay Lightning. It was believed that Garrison would step in and contribute to the power play and replace the departed Salo, who had performed a similar role. However, he struggled to adjust with his new team. He was taken off the power play unit and dropped to the third pairing within the first month. After the injuries to Bieksa, Garrison was moved from left defenceman to the right side pairing with Dan Hamhuis. The coaching staff came to consider this pairing to be the best and most trusted. Garrison finished the season with eight goals and eight assists, scoring three goals and three assists on the power play, and registering a +18 rating. His plus-minus was second on the team and led all defenceman.

Trades

Free agents acquired

Free agents lost

Claimed via waivers

Lost via waivers

Player signings

Draft picks

The 2012 NHL Entry Draft was held on June 22–23, 2012, at the Consol Energy Center in Pittsburgh, Pennsylvania. In the first round, the Canucks drafted Brendan Gaunce, a two-way centre with size. Leading up to the draft, Gaunce was ranked 13th among North American skaters by the NHL's scouting department, and was the top-ranked Canadian forward. Projected to be a mid-first-round pick, he dipped slightly to 26 where he was selected by the Canucks. general manager Mike Gillis stated that going into the draft, they had targeted Gaunce, and if he had not been available, Vancouver would have traded down to add extra picks.

With their second pick, the Canucks selected Alexandre Mallet, a gritty centreman who was passed over in his first year of draft eligibility. Mallet's section was the first in a series "late-bloomer" picks aimed at acquiring players who were either ready for the NHL or going to college. Fifth-round selection Ben Hutton was heading to the University of Maine. Sixth-round pick Wesley Myron, the first British Columbia native to be drafted by the Canucks in four years, was going to Boston University, while seventh-rounder Matthew Beattie would attend Yale University. In their yearly draft assessment, The Hockey News'' gave the Canucks a D grade for drafting Gaunce, whose stock was falling, as well as four players who had not been selected in prior drafts.

source:
Draft notes
 Vancouver's third-round pick went to the Anaheim Ducks as the result of a February 28, 2011, trade that sent Maxim Lapierre and MacGregor Sharp to the Canucks in exchange for Joel Perrault and this pick.
 Vancouver's fourth-round pick went to the Columbus Blue Jackets as the result of a February 27, 2012, trade that sent Samuel Pahlsson to the Canucks in exchange for Taylor Ellington, a 2012 fourth-round pick (from the New York Islanders) and this pick.

Farm team

The Canucks completed their second season with the Chicago Wolves as American Hockey League affiliate, the final one under the two teams' contract. The Wolves started the season by winning their first four games for the second time in franchise history. The following games were not as fruitful as they lost five of their next six games and their starting goaltender Eddie Lack suffered a hip injury. The injury required surgery, and Lack missed the remainder of the season. With Lack out the Wolves finished fifteenth in the league for fewest goals allowed. The previous season they allowed the fifth fewest goals in the league. Lack and back-up Matt Climie set a franchise record for lowest team goals against average. With the league's nineteenth best offense, the Wolves were unable to overcome the goals against them and finished fourth in their division. Thus missing the playoffs. It was the second time in three years that the Wolves missed the playoffs, but only the fourth time in franchise history. Despite missing the playoffs, Chicago finished second in league attendance.

Late in the season, reports began to surface that the Canucks would be purchasing their own AHL team and relocating it. Vancouver wanted to have more control over personnel decisions for their farm team and bought the Peoria Rivermen. The Canucks had originally hoped to move the franchise to nearby Abbotsford, British Columbia, which was home of the Calgary Flames AHL affiliate the Abbotsford Heat. Calgary indicated they would be willing to move their franchise, but a deal between the Canucks and the city of Abbotsford was unable to be reached. With the Abbotsford deal not working out, the Canucks set out to find a new home for their affiliate. They considered moving the team to Vancouver and sharing Rogers Arena, but the city was within the 50-mile territorial radius provided by the AHL. They next considered moving the team to Seattle, Washington, but were not allowed by the NHL. Seattle was a candidate to land the Phoenix Coyotes if a lease agreement could not be reached with the city of Glendale. Eventually, the Canucks decided to relocate their franchise to Utica, New York, creating the Comets.

Notes
1: The NHL uses a point system for their standings that awards two points for a win and one point an overtime or shootout loss. The denotation of a team's record is wins-losses-overtime/shootout losses.

References 

Vancouver Canucks season, 2012-13
Vancouver Canucks seasons
Vanc
Vancouver Canucks
Vancouver Canucks